JC Lipon (born July 10, 1993) is a Canadian professional ice hockey forward currently playing for Straubing Tigers of the Deutsche Eishockey Liga (DEL). He has previously played for the Winnipeg Jets of the National Hockey League (NHL).

Playing career
Lipon was selected by the Winnipeg Jets in the third round (91st overall) of the 2013 NHL Entry Draft.
 
He played junior hockey for the Kamloops Blazers of the Western Hockey League. He made his NHL debut for the Jets on January 18, 2016.  On August 15, 2016, the Winnipeg Jets signed Lipon to a one-year, two-way contract worth $650,000.

On August 17, 2020, Lipon left the Winnipeg Jets organization as a free agent and signed his first contract abroad with Latvian based, Dinamo Riga of the Kontinental Hockey League (KHL). In his first season abroad in 2020–21, Lipon made an impact with Dinamo Riga, collecting 8 goals and 20 points through 37 regular season games. With Riga well out of playoff contention, Lipon left the club to join Swedish top tier club, IK Oskarshamn of the Swedish Hockey League (SHL), for the remainder of the season on February 16, 2021.

As a free agent in the following off-season, Lipon opted to return to the KHL, agreeing to a one-year contract with Russian based, HC Sochi, on August 24, 2021. In the 2021–22 season, Lipon recorded 3 goals and 10 points through 27 regular season games with Sochi before he was traded to HC Sibir Novosibirsk on December 27, 2021.

On July 26, 2022, having left the KHL as a free agent, Lipon signed a one-year contract in Germany with Straubing Tigers of the DEL.

Career statistics

Regular season and playoffs

International

References

External links

1993 births
Living people
Canadian ice hockey right wingers
Dinamo Riga players
Ice hockey people from Saskatchewan
Kamloops Blazers players
Manitoba Moose players
IK Oskarshamn players
St. John's IceCaps players
HC Sibir Novosibirsk players
HC Sochi players
Sportspeople from Regina, Saskatchewan
Straubing Tigers players
Winnipeg Jets draft picks
Winnipeg Jets players